Celle di Macra (sometimes ‘Celle Macra’) is a comune (municipality) in the Province of Cuneo, region of Piedmont, Italy. At the end of 2017 it had a population of 94.

Celle di Macra borders the following municipalities: Castelmagno, Macra, Marmora and San Damiano Macra.

The churches of San Giovanni has a 1496 polyptych by the Flemish master Hans Clemer, who worked in the court of the Marquis of Saluzzo.

References

Cities and towns in Piedmont